George Brosius (September 9, 1839March 17, 1920) was a German-American gymnastics teacher associated from 1854 to 1915 with the Milwaukee Turnverein. He served in the Union Army from 1861 to 1864. He introduced physical education to the Milwaukee public schools in 1875 and supervised it until 1883. His crowning achievement was leading seven members of the Milwaukee Turnverein to the international gymnastics tournament in Frankfurt am Main in 1880, where they won the 2nd, 3rd, 5th, 13th, and 21st individual prizes. He served as director of the American Gymnastic Union's Normal College of Physical Education in Milwaukee from 1875 to 1899.

Gallery

Publications

 Brosius, George. Fifty Years Devoted to the Cause of Physical Culture, 1864-1914 (Milwaukee: Germania Publishing, 1914).

See also
Turners

References

External links
 

1839 births
1920 deaths
American people of German descent
American gymnastics coaches
Sportspeople from Milwaukee
People associated with physical culture
People of Wisconsin in the American Civil War
Union Army officers